Robert Flint (fl. 1547), was an English politician.

He was a Member (MP) of the Parliament of England for Thirsk in 1547.

References

Year of birth missing
Year of death missing
English MPs 1547–1552